Pürevdorjiin Serdamba (April 18, 1985) is a retired Mongolian amateur boxer.  He won a silver medal at the 2008 Olympics in the junior flyweight division. He became the first Mongolian to win a gold medal at the World Amateur Boxing Championships in 2009.

Career
Southpaw Serdamba lost his first bout at the 2007 World Championships to David Ayrapetyan 7:34. He won a gold medal at the 2009 World Amateur Boxing Championships held in Milan, Italy defeating David Ayrapetyan.

Olympic results 
2008 (as a Light flyweight)
Defeated Ronald Serugo (Uganda) 9-5
Defeated Luis Yanez (United States) 8-7
Defeated Amnat Ruanroeng (Thailand) 5-2
Defeated Yampier Hernández (Cuba) 8-8 (countback tiebreaker)
Lost to Zou Shiming (China) shoulder injury, score 0:1
2012 (as a Light flyweight)
Lost to Devendro Singh (India), score 16:11

World Championship results 
2009 (as a Light flyweight)
Defeated Miroslav Kovach (Czech) 10-3
Defeated Paulo Carvaho (Brazil) 5-2
Defeated Hovhannes Danielyan (Armenia) 6-4 
Defeated Li Jiazhao (China) 11-7
Defeated David Ayrapetyan (Russia) 10-5 World Champion

References

External links
 

World 2007

1985 births
Living people
Light-flyweight boxers
Boxers at the 2008 Summer Olympics
Boxers at the 2012 Summer Olympics
Olympic boxers of Mongolia
Olympic silver medalists for Mongolia
Olympic medalists in boxing
Boxers at the 2006 Asian Games
Boxers at the 2010 Asian Games
Medalists at the 2008 Summer Olympics
World boxing champions
Mongolian male boxers
AIBA World Boxing Championships medalists
Asian Games competitors for Mongolia
21st-century Mongolian people